Theodore Walter Jandrell aka Theo W. Jandrell (19 August 1888 in Richmond, Cape Colony - 1968) was a South African teacher, principal of the Volksrust Primary School, educationist, inspector of schools, and prolific Afrikaans poet and folksong writer.

Jandrell was a major contributor to the FAK Volksangbundel, a compendium of Afrikaans songs with music first published in 1937. His lyrics drew inspiration from songwriters such as Stephen Foster and traditional European and American melodies. His "Bolandse Nooi'ntjie" was based on Foster's "Beautiful Dreamer".

Publications
"Kinders van die lig" Arranged and translated by Theo. W. Jandrell and Amy Catherine Walton (1956)
"Moeder en Kind, en ander gediggies" - Theo W. Jandrell (1924)
"Die Ou Murasie, en ander gediggies" - Theo W. Jandrell (1924)              	
"Die dageraad liederbundel vir laerskole (standerds IV tot VI)" : 63 songs for piano - Hugo Gutsche, Theo W Jandrell

References

External links
Words and music of Afrikaans folksongs

20th-century South African poets
South African songwriters
1888 births
1968 deaths
South African male poets
Afrikaans-language writers
20th-century South African male writers